Thomas Lewis (April 27, 1718 – January 31, 1790) was an Irish-American surveyor, lawyer, politician and pioneer of early western Virginia. He was among the signers of the Fairfax Resolves, represented Augusta County at four of the five Virginia Revolutionary Conventions and the first session of the Virginia House of Delegates during the American War for Independence, and after the conflict, represented newly established Rockingham County at the Virginia Ratification Convention, as well as contributed to the settlement of an area that long after his death become part of West Virginia.

Early life
Lewis was born to John (1678–1762) and Margaret Lynn Lewis (1693–1773) in County Donegal, Ireland on April 27, 1718. Needing to leave Ireland after killing his landlord, John Lewis immigrated to Philadelphia in 1728; and two years later brought over his family, including Thomas and his brothers Andrew and William. In the summer of 1732 the Lewis family moved to the western frontier, following the Shenandoah River south into Virginia, and finally settled near the headwaters of the south fork in what was then vast Spotsylvania County. The family established a farm and built a stone house for defense against the raids.

The Crown in 1736 granted Robert Beverley's son, Col. William Beverley, a wealthy planter and merchant from Essex County in the Virginia colony, more than 118,000 acres (478 km²)(in what would become Augusta County). This effectively made the Lewis family squatters on Beverley's new land grant. John Lewis corrected this in 1739 by purchasing 2,000 acres (8 km²) along Lewis Creek (about a mile (2 km) east of what is now Staunton, Virginia) from Beverley. He named his new home "Bellefonte".

Thomas Lewis was considered an ardent student as a young man, partly because he was very nearsighted. Later, he learned surveying and read law. As early as 1739 he began acquiring land of his own to the south and west of Beverley's Manor in what is today Rockingham and Bath counties.

Lewis married Jane Strother (from an established family in Stafford County) on January 26, 1749, and moved north to what would later become Rockingham County. The couple built a plantation they called "Lynnwood" near Port Republic and the confluence of the north and south forks of the Shenandoah River. They raised thirteen children. One son, Thomas Lewis, Jr., served in the U.S. Congress as well as the Virginia House of Delegates.

Career
The House of Burgesses had authorized creation of still-vast Augusta County in 1738, but seven years passed before European settlement had grown enough to justify organizing the county's government. Thomas Lewis became one of the first county judges (commissioners) in 1745. Shortly afterward, in 1746, Lewis and Peter Jefferson surveyed part of the boundaries of Lord Fairfax's 5,282,000 acre (61,000 km²) land grant (see the Fairfax Line). Lewis kept detailed journals of several surveying expeditions, which provide a historical view of early western Virginia. In 1746 he laid out the first Staunton town plat for William Beverley.

Lewis held a number of local offices, and was surveyor of Augusta County for many years beginning in 1746. He also became a founding trustee of Liberty Hall, formerly the Augusta Academy, which in 1776 was renamed in a burst of revolutionary fervor and relocated to Lexington, Virginia. Other founding trustees included his brother Andrew Lewis, Samuel McDowell, Sampson Mathews, George Moffett, William Preston, and James Waddel. Finally receiving a state charter in 1782, Liberty Hall would be renamed again, to Washington College and eventually became Washington and Lee University. It is now the country's ninth oldest institution of higher education.

In the early days of the American Revolution, following unrest over new taxes imposed by Britain to fund the French and Indian War and Lord Dunmore's War, Virginia governor Lord Dunmore suppressed the House of Burgesses in which his younger brother Andrew Lewis represented Botetourt County (established in 1772 and which lay south of Augusta County). Augusta County voters elected Thomas Lewis and Samuel McDowell to four of the five Virginia Revolutionary Conventions that replaced the Burgesses. (His brother Andrew was a delegate for Botetourt County.) When the new state government was created in 1776, Lewis was elected to the state's first House of Delegates.

In 1778, the year the Virginia General Assembly split Augusta County in order to create Rockingham County, Thomas Lewis journeyed even further along the Ohio River to what later became to Pittsburgh. He was among the men who negotiated a controversial treaty with the Delaware Indians, guaranteeing their neutrality for the rest of the war. He was one of the Virginia commissioners appointed to negotiate a resolution in 1779 with Pennsylvania over the two states' western-border dispute.

In 1788, Lewis became one of the delegates for Rockingham County, along with his brother-in-law Gabriel Jones, to the Virginia convention which ultimately ratified the U.S. Constitution. The previous year, either this man (or his son) owned nine enslaved adults and 14 slave children in Rockingham County.

When the Virginia General Assembly authorized establishment of Kanawha County and established a court to administer the county, Lewis became one of the court's twelve members; the court met for the first time on October 5, 1789, at the house of George Clendenin in Charleston.

Death and legacy
Lewis died at Lynnwood in 1790, by which time his son had begun serving part time as one of Kanawh County's representatives in the Virginia House of Delegates, and would later briefly serve in the U.S. House of Representatives. Thomas Lewis Sr. is buried beside his wife Jane in the Lewis Family burial ground in Rockingham County. On December 19, 1794, the Virginia General Assembly passed an act which established the town of Point Pleasant  on Lewis' property at the mouth of the Kanawha River (in present-day Mason County, West Virginia). His journal of his 1746 surveying journey was printed in 1925.

See also
Allegheny Mountains

References

1718 births
1790 deaths
American planters
American surveyors
Delegates to the Virginia Ratifying Convention
18th-century American politicians
House of Burgesses members
Kingdom of Ireland emigrants to the Thirteen Colonies
Members of the Virginia House of Delegates
People from County Donegal
People from Kanawha County, West Virginia
People from Rockingham County, Virginia
Virginia colonial people
Virginia lawyers
Virginia pioneers
American lawyers admitted to the practice of law by reading law
People from Augusta County, Virginia
Washington and Lee University trustees